Arturo Benedetti Michelangeli (5 January 1920 – 12 June 1995) was an Italian classical pianist. He is considered one of the greatest pianists of the twentieth century. According to The New York Times, he was perhaps the most reclusive, enigmatic and obsessive among the handful of the world's legendary pianists.

Early life and studies 
Benedetti Michelangeli was born near Brescia, in Italy. His date of birth is usually given as 5 January 1920. He himself once said that he was born 'during the first hour of the morning of 6 January 1920'. His father, who was a count and a lawyer by profession, was also a musician and a composer and began teaching music to Benedetti Michelangeli before he was four years old. Benedetti Michelangeli learned to play the violin at the age of three and would later study the instrument at the Venturi Institute in Brescia before switching to piano under Dr. Paulo Chimeri, who accepted him into his class following an audition. He also studied organ and composition. When he was nine, he began having private lessons with Giovanni Anfossi in Milan.

At ten years old, Benedetti Michelangeli began his formal music education at the Milan Conservatory, where he graduated with honours at the age of 14. Although Benedetti Michelangeli's parents were passionate about music, they did not want Arturo to become a pianist. In view of his family's attitude  Benedetti Michelangeli studied medicine for several years although he never set music aside and continued to play regularly.

Professional career 

In May 1938, at the age of eighteen, Michelangeli began his international career by entering the Ysaÿe International Festival in Brussels, Belgium, where he finished seventh. A brief account of the competition, at which Emil Gilels took first prize and Moura Lympany second, is given by Arthur Rubinstein, who was one of the judges. According to Rubinstein, Benedetti Michelangeli gave "an unsatisfactory performance, but already showed his impeccable technique." A year later he won the first prize in the Geneva International Music Competition, where he was acclaimed as "a new Liszt" by pianist Alfred Cortot, a member of the judging panel, which was presided over by Ignacy Jan Paderewski. Upon winning the competition, Benito Mussolini gave Michelangeli a teaching position at the Martini Conservatory in Bologna, Italy.

The outbreak of World War II interrupted Michelangeli's career just as it had begun. Despite future Queen of Italy Maria José Savoia's efforts to exonerate him from the army, Michelangeli was drafted. He joined the Italian airforce, and as soon as the war was over, returned to music. After a long break, his first appearance was in Warsaw during the 5th Chopin Festival, where he dropped out of the competition in protest as Vladimir Ashkenazy, whom he believed should have won, finished second to Adam Harasiewicz by a small margin. In 1948 Michelangeli toured the United States for the first time, making his orchestral debut at Carnegie Hall in November, performing Schumann's Piano Concerto in A minor Op. 54 with the New York Philharmonic and Dimitri Mitropoulos. In January 1949 he made his solo debut at Carnegie Hall. Following his spell at Conservatorio in Bologna, Michelangeli's teaching activity continued in Venice, Berlin, Geneva and Budapest. His concept of training students to become professional piano concertists was unorthodox but successful, and he taught for several years in Bozen, and from 1952 to 1964 in Arezzo (with a break caused by ill health between 1953 and 1955). The courses eventually resulted in the foundation of the Arturo Benedetti Michelangeli International Piano Academy, which was to be organized by the city and provincial authorities in Arezzo, in cooperation with the 'Amici della Musica' Society. Unfortunately, the project did not come to fruition. He ran further courses in Moncalieri, Siena, and Lugano, and from 1967 he gave private tuitions at a Rabbi in his Alpine villa in the province of Trento.

In 1988, Michelangeli suffered a ruptured abdominal aneurysm during a concert in Bordeaux. After more than seven hours of surgery, he overcame this health issue. A few months later, on 7 June 1989, he played Mozart concertos Nos. 20 and 25 with the Nord Deutsche Rundfunk orchestra conducted by Cord Garben. In 1990, he again recorded two Mozart concertos, KV. 415 and KV. 503 in Bremen. Michelangeli's last public performance was held in Hamburg on May 7, 1993.

As a composer, Benedetti Michelangeli arranged 19 Italian folk songs a cappella for the Coro della Società Alpinisti Tridentini and a men's chorus from Trento (Italy). A recording of these pieces are available on the DIVOX music label.

Benedetti Michelangeli's students included Maurizio Pollini, Martha Argerich, Ivan Moravec, Paul Stewart, Aldo Antognazzi, Vladimir Krpan, Lucia Passaglia and Carlo Dominici.

Sergiu Celibidache considered Benedetti Michelangeli a fellow conductor, and not merely a pianist: "Michelangeli makes colors; he is a conductor." Celibidache also described Michelangeli as one of the "greatest living artist".

Teacher and commentator David Dubal argued that Benedetti Michelangeli was at his best when he performed the earlier works of Beethoven but seemed insecure with Chopin. He added that Benedetti Michelangeli was "demonic" in works such as the Bach-Busoni Chaconne and Brahms's Paganini Variations.

Benedetti Michelangeli's highlights include the (authorized) live performances in London of Ravel's Gaspard de la nuit, Chopin's Mazurkas and Sonata No. 2, Schumann's Carnaval, Op. 9 and Faschingsschwank aus Wien, Op. 26 as well as various recordings of Beethoven's Piano Concerto No. 5, Liszt's Piano Concerto No. 1 and Totentanz, and the piano concertos of Robert Schumann, and Edvard Grieg.

Personal life 
On 20 September 1943 Benedetti Michelangeli married pianist Giulia Linda Guidetti, who was a pupil of his father. They lived in Bornato, near Brescia, Bolzano and Arezzo. They separated in 1970. In the 1970s Michelangeli lived in Switzerland and refused to live or perform in his native Italy for over a decade.

Following his divorce, his secretary, and later his agent and partner, Marie-José Gros-Dubois organized concerts and dates for him, and also presided over his financial affairs.

In an interview, Gros-Dubois recalled that Benedetti Michelangeli could not believe his musical career was so financially successful. After a concert, she reported that he gloomily said: "You see, so much applause, so much public. Then, in half an hour, you feel alone more than before."

Benedetti Michelangeli was a connoisseur of the piano mechanics and insisted for his concert instruments to be in perfect condition. His last concert took place on 7 May 1993 in Hamburg, Germany. After a long illness he died on 12 June 1995 in Lugano, Switzerland. He is buried in nearby Pura.

Racing career 
Michelangeli was a three-time competitor in the Mille Miglia road race.

Awards and recognition 
Queen Elisabeth Competition: Seventh Prize (1938)
Geneva International Competition: First Prize (1939)
15th Annual Grammy Awards Best Classical Performance – Instrumental Soloist or Soloists (Without Orchestra): Nomination (1972)
Debussy: Images, Books 1 And 2 and Children's Corner Suite (Album) 
18th Annual Grammy Awards Best Classical Performance – Instrumental Soloist or Soloists (Without Orchestra): Nomination (1975)
Schumann: Carnaval, Op. 9 (Album)

Michelangeli was chosen by an international panel as the official pianist for the 100th anniversary of Chopin's death (1949).

The International Piano Festival of Brescia and Bergamo 
In 1962, the 'Amici della Musica' Society in Arezzo organized the first Benedetti Michelangeli Festival. Michelangeli's pupils took part, giving concerts in various locations in Tuscany. The festival concluded with a performance in Arezzo by Michelangeli himself. A similar event took place the following year.

In 1964, Benedetti Michelangeli founded the International Piano Festival of Brescia and Bergamo – one of the major world events dedicated to piano music, intended both as a solo instrument and as an orchestra interlocutor.

From 1964, the festival moved to Brescia and Bergamo, and Michelangeli remained its artistic director for about three years. Pianists appearing at the festival include Magaloff, Richter, Arrau, Pollini, Ashkenazy, Radu Lupu, Zimerman, Brendel, Martha Argerich, Evgeny Kissin, Grigory Sokolov, and instrumentalists, singers and conductors such as Mstislav Rostropovich, Mischa Maisky, Uto Ughi, Luciano Pavarotti, Riccardo Muti, Claudio Abbado, Gergiev, Giulini, Sawallisch, Solti, Maazel and Chung.

Recordings 

 Beethoven: Piano Concerto No. 5 in E flat major, Op. 73, "Emperor" (1982)

References

Citations

Sources

External links

 
www.arturobenedettimichelangeli.com
The Arturo Benedetti Michelangeli Documentation Centre (Biography, articles and events. Site is in Italian, English and German)
Jacques Leiser & Ates Orga 'Fifty Years of Music with my Husband, Arturo Michelangeli', Clavier May/June 2002
Arturo Benedetti-Michelangeli Complete Discography and Concertography
https://www.baltimoresun.com/news/bs-xpm-1995-06-13-1995164027-story.html
https://www.racingsportscars.com/driver/results/Arturo%20Benedetti-Michelangeli-.html
https://www.repubblica.it/spettacoli/teatro-danza/2021/01/31/news/e_morto_il_pianista_alberto_neuman_allievo_di_michelangeli-285210797/

1920 births
1995 deaths
Musicians from Brescia
Italian classical pianists
Male classical pianists
Italian male pianists
Deutsche Grammophon artists
Milan Conservatory alumni
20th-century classical pianists
20th-century Italian musicians
20th-century Italian male musicians
Italian expatriates in Switzerland